Joseph-Noël Sylvestre (1847–1926) was a French artist, notable for his studies of classic scenes from antiquity.

Life 
Joseph-Noël Sylvestre was born on 24 June 1847 in Béziers in South-West France.

He began his training as an artist first in Toulouse under Thomas Couture, then at the École des Beaux-Arts in Paris under Alexandre Cabanel. He was an exponent of the romantic Academic art style, also known as art pompier (fireman's art), examples of which are the Death of Seneca (1875), The Gaul Ducar decapitates the Roman general Flaminius at the Battle of Trasimene (1882), The Sack of Rome by the barbarians in 410 (1890) and François Rude working on the Arc de Triomphe (1893).

Gallery

References

Sources 

 This article began as a translation of its French equivalent.

1847 births
1926 deaths
People from Béziers
French romantic painters
French neoclassical painters
Academic art
19th-century French painters
French male painters
20th-century French painters
20th-century French male artists
19th-century French male artists